The 2013–14 LSU Tigers basketball team represented Louisiana State University during the 2013–14 NCAA Division I men's basketball season. The team's head coach was Johnny Jones, who was in his second season at LSU.  They played their home games at Pete Maravich Assembly Center as members of the Southeastern Conference.

Previous season and offseason
LSU completed the 2012-13 season with an overall record of 19-12 and a 9-9 record in Southeastern Conference play.  After receiving a bye for the first round of the SEC tournament, the Tigers defeated the Georgia Bulldogs in the second round.  They were eliminated by the Florida Gators, the SEC regular season champions, in the quarterfinals.  LSU was not invited to any other postseason tournament.

The Tigers lost one of their top scorers with the departure of point guard Charles Carmouche.  The team's leader in scoring and rebounding and first team all-SEC forward Johnny O'Bryant elected to return for his junior season.  LSU's 2013 recruiting class was rated in the top ten by all major recruiting services and included Jarell Martin, considered by many to be one of the top high school basketball players in the country.

Departures

Recruits

Roster

Schedule and results

|-
!colspan=12 style="background:#33297B; color:#FDD023;"| Exhibition

|-
!colspan=12 style="background:#33297B; color:#FDD023;"| Non-conference regular season

|-
!colspan=12 style="background:#33297B; color:#FDD023;"| SEC regular season

|-
!colspan=12 style="background:#33297B;"| SEC Tournament

|-
!colspan=12 style="background:#33297B;"| National Invitation Tournament

Source:

References

See also
2013–14 LSU Lady Tigers basketball team

LSU Tigers basketball seasons
Lsu
LSU
LSU
LSU